There are several places named Devil's Peak, Devils Peak or Devil Peak.

Mountain peaks
 Devils Peak (Antarctica)
 Devil's Peak (Cape Town), South Africa 
 Devil's Peak, Hong Kong
 Devils Peak (South Australia), a mountain in Australia
 Devils Peak (Santa Barbara County, California), Channel Islands of California
 Picacho del Diablo, Baja California, Mexico

 Devil Peak (Nevada), U.S.
 Devils Peak (Washington), U.S.

Other uses
 Devil's Peak, a 2004 novel by Deon Meyer
 Devil's Peak (film), a 2023 American film

See also
 Devils Tower